The 2nd Independent Battery Wisconsin Light Artillery  was an artillery battery that served in the Union Army during the American Civil War.

Service
The 2nd Independent Battery was mustered into service at Racine, Wisconsin, on October 10, 1861.

The battery was mustered out on July 10, 1865.

Total strength and casualties
The 2nd Independent Battery initially recruited 153 officers and men.  An additional 42 men were recruited as replacements, for a total of 195
men.

The regiment suffered 12 enlisted men who died of disease, for a total of 12 fatalities.

Commanders
 Captain Ernst F. Herzberg
 Captain Charles Beger

See also

 List of Wisconsin Civil War units
 Wisconsin in the American Civil War

Notes

References
The Civil War Archive

Military units and formations established in 1861
Military units and formations disestablished in 1865
Units and formations of the Union Army from Wisconsin
Artillery units and formations of the American Civil War
1861 establishments in Wisconsin